miRNEST is  database of animal, plant and virus microRNAs.

See also
 microRNAs

References

External links
 http://mirnest.amu.edu.pl

Biological databases
MicroRNA
RNA